Deilig er fjorden! (The Fjord Is Lovely!) is a 1985 Norwegian comedy film directed by Jan Erik Düring, starring Rolv Wesenlund, Elsa Lystad and Sverre Holm. Terje Svahberg (Wesenlund) has been saving money for years to buy a summer house, but suddenly decides he wants a boat instead. As he and his family prepare for their summer vacation, they encounter several problems, both practical and financial.

The film title is a pun on the psalm "Deilig er jorden" ("Fairest Lord Jesus").

References

External links
 
 

1985 films
1985 comedy films
Norwegian comedy films
1980s Norwegian-language films
Films directed by Jan Erik Düring